Saratoga Springs is a city in Saratoga County, New York, United States. The population was 28,491 at the 2020 census. The name reflects the presence of mineral springs in the area, which has made Saratoga a popular resort destination for over 200 years. It is home to the Saratoga Race Course, a thoroughbred horse racing track, and Saratoga Performing Arts Center, a music and dance venue. The city's official slogan is "Health, History, and Horses."

History

The British built Fort Saratoga in 1691 on the west bank of the Hudson River. Shortly thereafter, British colonists settled the current village of Schuylerville approximately one mile south; it was known as Saratoga until 1831.

Native Americans believed the springs about 10 miles (16 km) west of the village—today called High Rock Spring—had medicinal properties. In 1767, William Johnson, a British soldier who was a hero of the French and Indian War, was brought by Native American friends to the spring to treat his war wounds. (In 1756, Johnson had been appointed British Superintendent of Indian Affairs in the Northeast region due to his success in building alliances with the Mohawk and other Iroquois tribes. He had learned the language and created many trading relationships. He achieved great wealth from trading and landholdings, and was knighted for his service to the Crown with the Iroquois.)

The first permanent European-American settler built a dwelling in the area circa 1776. The springs attracted tourists, and Gideon Putnam built the first hotel for travelers. Putnam also laid out the roads and donated land for use as public spaces.

The Battle of Saratoga, the turning point of the Revolutionary War, did not take place in Saratoga Springs. A museum dedicated to the two battles sits on the former battlefields. The surrender of the sword of battle took place where Fort Saratoga had been, south of Schuylerville.

Saratoga Springs was established as a settlement in 1819 from a western portion of the Town of Saratoga. Its principal community was incorporated as a village in 1826, and the entire region became a city in 1915. Tourism was greatly aided by the 1832 arrival of the Saratoga and Schenectady Railroad, which brought thousands of travelers to the famous mineral springs. Resort hotels developed to accommodate them. Patronage of the railroad increased steadily after the Delaware and Hudson Canal Company assumed control in 1870 and began running the Empire State Express directly between New York City and the resort.

In the 19th century, noted doctor Simon Baruch encouraged developing European-style spas in the United States as centers for health. With its wealth of mineral waters, Saratoga Springs was developed as a spa, generating the development of many large hotels, including the United States Hotel and the Grand Union Hotel. The latter was, in its day, the largest hotel in the world.

In 1863, Saratoga Race Course opened, moving to its current location the following year. Horse racing and its associated betting greatly increased the city's attraction as a tourist destination at a time when horse racing was a popular national spectator sport. In addition, the Saratoga Springs area was known for its gambling, which after the first years of the 20th century was illegal, but still widespread. Most gambling facilities were located on Saratoga Lake, on the southeast side of the city.

By 1870, it was the nation's top upscale resort relying on natural mineral springs, horse racing, gambling, and luxury hotels.  World War II imposed severe travel restrictions which financially ruined the tourist industry. During the 1950s, the state and city closed the famed gambling houses in a crackdown on illegal gambling. The closing and demolition in the 1950s of some premier hotels, including the Grand Union and the United States hurt tourism. However, since 1970 there tourism has revived with a renovated racetrack, a 28-day exclusive racing season, winter sports emphasis, and an influx of young professionals. The city became more accessible with the completion of the Adirondack Northway (Interstate 87), which allowed visitors easier access from the north and south. In addition, the construction of the Saratoga Performing Arts Center in the late 1960s, which features classical and popular music and dance, furthered the city's renaissance era. The New York City Ballet and the Philadelphia Orchestra have summer residencies there, together with other high-quality dance groups and musicians. Since the early 1990s, there has been a boom of building, both residential and retail, in the west side and downtown areas of the city, and Skidmore College has flourished.

Springs

Before racing began in Saratoga, the area's natural mineral springs had been attracting wealthy families for many decades.  The springs occur on a line where the north-south Saratoga Fault allows water trapped in subsurface shale layers to reach the surface.

Believed to have healing powers, springs can be found in multiple places around the town. Most of the springs are covered by small pavilions and marked by plaques. Others are less conspicuous, sometimes just a spigot in a rock. The springs are famous for their varied and distinct tastes: some are clear freshwater, others are saltier, and some taste strongly of a certain mineral such as sodium bicarbonate or sodium chloride. There is a sulfurous odor, but mineral analysis of the water consistently shows almost no presence of dissolved sulfur. The sulfur is in the form of the gas hydrogen sulfide, which degasses from the water very quickly. Visitors are welcome to bottle the spring water for personal consumption.

Toward the end of the 19th century, excessive pumping for commercial bottling was threatening to deplete the springs.  In 1911, the New York State Reservation, now the Spa State Park, was created to protect the springs, and the Lincoln and Roosevelt bath houses were built. Currently, luxury spa treatments with these waters are available in the Roosevelt Baths.

Geography

The Adirondack Northway of New York (Interstate 87) and US Route 9 pass alongside and through the city, respectively. New York State Route 29, New York State Route 50, New York State Route 9N, and New York State Route 9P lead into Saratoga Springs. NY 9N has its southern terminus and NY 9P has its northern terminus in the city. US 9 and NY 50 overlap in the city, joined briefly by NY 29.

Saratoga Lake is slightly south of the city.

Climate

Demographics

2012
According to the 2010 U.S. Census Bureau:

92.5% White
1.7% Black
0.1% Native American
2.01% Asian
0.0% Native Hawaiian or Pacific Islander
3.1% Two or more races
0.64% Other races
4.0% Hispanic or Latino (of any race)

As of the census of 2012, there were 26,711 people, 11,312 households, and 5,923 families residing in the city.  The population density was 921.1 people per square mile (355.6/km2).  There were 11,584 housing units at an average density of 407.5 per square mile (157.3/km2).  The racial makeup of the city was 92.5% White, 1.7% African American, 0.1% Native American, 2.01% Asian, 0.00% Pacific Islander, 0.64% from other races, and 3.1% from two or more races. Hispanic or Latino of any race were 4.0% of the population.

There were 11,312 households, out of which 25.3% had children under the age of 18 living with them, 43.1% were married couples living together, 9.6% had a female householder with no husband present, and 44.5% were non-families.  35.0% of all households were made up of individuals, and 12.3% had someone living alone who was 65 years of age or older.  The average household size was 2.21 and the average family size was 2.88.

In the city, the age distribution of the population shows 19.4% under the age of 18, 15.5% from 18 to 24, 27.5% from 25 to 44, 23.4% from 45 to 64, and 14.3% who were 65 years of age or older.  The median age was 36 years. For every 100 females, there were 90.4 males.  For every 100 females age 18 and over, there were 87.1 males.

In 2012, the median income for a household was $91,392, while the mean income for a family was $114,560. The median income for a household in the city was $62,766, while the mean income for a household was $81,807. Males had a median income of $61,582 versus $47,759 for females. About 3.0% of families and 7.5% of the population were below the poverty line, including 7.3% of those under age 18 and 6.3% of those age 65 or over.

Economy

Saratoga Springs relies heavily on tourism as its main source of income during the summer season while the Saratoga Race Course is open. Many residents commute daily to Albany via Interstate 87, Interstate 787, and Interstate 90. The business district in Saratoga increasingly contributes to the economy year round, as the city has attracted many national and international brand retailers, as well as local boutiques. It has become an upscale shopping destination for the Albany metropolitan area.

In industry, the Saratoga Spring Water Co. (a division of Anheuser-Busch InBev) is located on Geyser Road. Operating since 1872, the water has been served during many presidential inaugurations in Washington, D.C., including Barack Obama's in 2013. Quad/Graphics, offset printers of Time, Newsweek, People, Sports Illustrated and many other magazines, has a plant here. Ball Corporation, makers of the Mason Jar as well as aluminum cans has a large manufacturing plant in the city. Stewart's Shops, a convenience store chain, is headquartered in Saratoga Springs.

Arts and culture
 

The Saratoga Performing Arts Center (SPAC) is a covered outdoor amphitheater located on the grounds of the Saratoga Spa State Park, with a capacity of 5,000 in reserved seating and 20,000+ on its general admission lawn area.  SPAC is the summer home of the Philadelphia Orchestra and the New York City Ballet, and has hosted a weekend-long jazz festival since 1978. Since 2006, the Saratoga Native American Festival has been held on SPAC grounds each fall.  SPAC is a stop for touring national recording artists:  over 20 popular bands grace the stage every summer.  Steps away on State Park grounds, the Spa Little Theater hosts the "Home Made Theater" as well as Opera Saratoga (formerly known as the Lake George Opera) during the summer. Since 2001, The Saratoga Shakespeare Company has presented professional summer productions of Shakespeare in historic Congress Park.

Museums in the area include the National Museum of Dance and Hall of Fame, the National Museum of Racing and Hall of Fame, and the Saratoga Automobile Museum. There are more than 20 golf courses in the area.
The city is notable for its vibrant night life. Caffè Lena was one of the first venues in the Eastern US at which Bob Dylan performed in 1961. Arlo Guthrie played at Caffè Lena early in his career and has returned for occasional benefit concerts, and the singer Don McLean was a frequent performer there early in his career.) Numerous other establishments are located on Broadway, Caroline Street (the Hamilton district), and the redeveloped Putnam Street.

Caroline Street at Broadway has been the center of Saratoga nightlife for decades for college students, horse racing season visitors, tourists and locals.  Recently, Beekman Street (four blocks West of Broadway), once the center of a working-class, primarily ethnic minority residential neighborhood for those who worked in the service jobs of the tourism economy, has become an art district, housing four galleries, a restaurant, a pub and teahouse, and a bistro. Artists live and work in co-ops and arrange social events.

Saratoga Springs is home to Yaddo, a  artists' community, founded by Wall Street financier Spencer Trask and his wife, author Katrina Trask. Since its inception in 1900, Yaddo has hosted 68 authors who later won the Pulitzer Prize and one Nobel Prize winner, Saul Bellow. Leonard Bernstein, Truman Capote, Aaron Copland, Sylvia Plath, and David Sedaris have all been artists-in-residence. The Yaddo grounds are adjacent to the backstretch of the Saratoga Race Course.

Over Presidents' Day weekend in February, Saratoga Springs draws more than 5000 attendees for the annual Flurry Festival, which features folk dance and music, including one of the largest contra dances in the United States.

Saratoga's New Year's celebration First Night Saratoga is the largest New Year's Eve event in New York outside of New York City.

Museums

The Frances Young Tang Teaching Museum and Art Gallery at Skidmore College
Schick Art Gallery, Skidmore College
National Museum Of Dance And Hall Of Fame
National Museum of Racing and Hall of Fame
New York State Military Museum And Veterans Research Center
Saratoga Automobile Museum
Saratoga Springs History Museum
Children's Museum of Saratoga
Saratoga Arts Center

Live performance
Theater – Home Made Theater- A not-for-profit theater company located in the Spa Little Theater of Saratoga Spa State Park; Saratoga Shakespeare Company - the capital region's only professional classical theater company, established 2001
Ballet – New York City Ballet at Saratoga Performing Arts Center, Saratoga City Ballet
Opera – Opera Saratoga
Music – Caffe Lena, Saratoga Performing Arts Center, Saratoga Music Hall, Universal Preservation Hall

National Register of Historic Places listings
Saratoga Springs has sixteen places listed in the National Register of Historic Places:
 Arrowhead Casino Prehistoric Site
 Broadway Historic District
 Canfield Casino and Congress Park
 The Drinkhall
 East Side Historic District
 Franklin Square Historic District
 Gideon Putnam Burying Ground
 Petrified Sea Gardens
 Pure Oil Gas Station
 Saratoga Gas, Electric Light and Power Company Complex
 Saratoga Spa State Park District
 Hiram Charles Todd House
 Union Avenue Historic District
 US Post Office-Saratoga Springs
 West Side Historic District
 Yaddo

Parks and recreation

Thoroughbred racing

Saratoga Race Course opened on August 3, 1863. The first track was located on East Avenue (at the present Oklahoma Training Track location) which is perpendicular to the present Saratoga Race Course, which opened the following year.  Founded by John Hunter and William R. Travers, the thoroughbred track is the oldest continuously operating sporting venue of any kind in the United States.  The track holds a summer meet lasting six weeks, from late July to Labor Day, that attracts the top horses, jockeys and trainers in America. The meet features a number of major stakes races, with the Travers Stakes, a Grade I race, being one of the most prominent of America's summer horse races.

Harness racing
Saratoga Casino and Raceway, a harness (Standardbred) racetrack that includes a hotel, video gaming facility, a nightclub, an upscale steakhouse, the Racino, and a horse betting simulcast room.

Golf
Saratoga Golf and Polo Club (private)
Saratoga National Golf (public)
Saratoga Spa Golf -Located in Saratoga Spa State Park (public)
Airway Meadows Golf Club (public)
McGregor Links Country Club (semi-private)

Polo
 The Saratoga Polo Association plays Fridays and Sundays mid-July through early September at Whitney Field in nearby Greenfield Center, New York

Saratoga Spa State Park
The Saratoga Spa State Park capitalizes on the culture and mineral springs that drove Saratoga Springs. This is a large state park and includes a hotel, 2 pool complexes, mineral baths, Saratoga Performing Arts Center (SPAC), picnic areas, hiking trails and numerous mineral springs. The Saratoga Performing Arts Center, located on the State Park grounds, has been the summer home of the Philadelphia Orchestra and New York City Ballet since 1966. Jazz and dance are featured at SPAC. The SPAC Amphitheater itself is 110 feet (34 m) high, sits in a natural, curved bowl that is bordered by large pine trees and a large lawn space, but is afflicted by the roar of nearby Geyser Creek, which creates serious acoustical problems. Inside the amphitheater is seating for 5100, the lawn can easily hold an additional 20,000 people. The park is also home to the National Museum of Dance and Hall of Fame, the Saratoga Automobile Museum, the Lincoln Mineral Baths and Spa, and the Gideon Putnam Resort & Spa.

Skateboard Park
The Saratoga Skatepark (est. 1988), located in the center of the East Side Recreation area on Lake Avenue, is New York State's first municipal skatepark. The exercise facility is known for its concrete skateboard "bowl" installed with a state-of-the-art design in 2004. The skatepark has metal ramps as well. In 2010 the city filled the pool with dirt, citing problems with graffiti, vandalism and unconfirmed structural issues affecting the skating surface. In addition, the city said that they lacked funds to staff guards at the park and claimed it had spent nearly $200,000 on the park since it opened in 1988. After a group of skateboarders lobbied the city and publicly offered to dig out the pool by hand, the city excavated it in November 2011.

Government
The Saratoga Springs charter specifies a "commission" form of city government.  Recent efforts to amend the charter have not been successful. The most recent charter change proposal appeared on the ballot in the November 2020 election and was overwhelmingly defeated. Prior attempts have netted mixed results with the closest margin of votes in 2017 where a difference of 10 votes upheld the current system of government.

The city is one of only three in the state of New York to have a three-tier tax district system, the inside district being what was originally the village of Saratoga Springs, and the outside district being the town of Saratoga Springs minus the village. The other two cities with a three-tier tax system are Rome and Oneida.

Education
Empire State College and Skidmore College are both located in Saratoga Springs; Verrazzano College (1969–1975) was also located there. During the summer, Skidmore is one of several hosts for the Johns Hopkins Center for Talented Youth. Eastern Nazarene College, located in Quincy, Massachusetts, was founded in Saratoga Springs as the Pentecostal Collegiate Institute and Biblical Seminary at the turn of the 20th century.

The Saratoga Springs City School District is made up of:
 Six elementary schools (kindergarten through grade five) – Lake Avenue, Caroline Street, Division Street and Geyser Road in the City of Saratoga Springs; Greenfield in the Town of Greenfield; and Dorothy Nolan in the Town of Wilton
 One middle school (grades six through eight) – Maple Avenue Middle School in the Town of Wilton
 One high school (grades nine through twelve) – Saratoga Springs High School located on the West side on Blue Streak Boulevard in the City of Saratoga Springs.

Private schools in Saratoga Springs include Saratoga Central Catholic High School, St. Clement's Regional Catholic School, The Waldorf School of Saratoga Springs, and Saratoga Independent School. Alternatively, some local children commute to Albany area schools such as The Emma Willard School, The Albany Academies, Doane Stuart School and La Salle Institute.

Media

Grid (formerly Saratoga Wire) daily online newspaper
The Saratogian newspaper (daily)
Saratoga TODAY newspaper (weekly) 
Saratoga Business Journal newspaper (bi-weekly)
The Spotlight newspaper (weekly)
Eco Local magazine (monthly)
Saratoga Seasons magazine
Saratoga Living magazine (quarterly)
Simply Saratoga magazine (by-monthly) 
The Skidmore News
Skidmore Unofficial
Saratoga.com
Saratogabusiness.net
Look TV television station

Infrastructure

Transportation

The closest scheduled air service is available at Albany International Airport (ALB).  There is also a general aviation facility, Saratoga County Airport (5B2), located west of city limits in the Town of Milton.

Amtrak provides service to Saratoga Springs, operating its Adirondack daily in both directions between Central Station in Montreal and Penn Station in New York City and the Ethan Allen Express daily in both directions between Rutland, Vermont and New York City.  The local station off of West Avenue was built in 1956 but was rehabilitated in 2004.  The  passenger area contains a coffee shop/newsstand, murals, an automated teller machine, a visitors information kiosk, an outside patio area with benches, and a children's play area.  The station serves about 23,000 passengers annually.

Greyhound Bus Lines serves the city frequently, sending buses every few hours towards Albany or Montreal.  The city Amtrak station serves as the Greyhound Bus Lines and Adirondack Trailways station.  The city is also served by the Capital District Transportation Authority, which provides bus service from Schenectady via Route 50 daily on bus route 450, service from Ballston Spa on bus route 451, service between the Wilton Mall and Skidmore College on bus route 452, and weekday service to Albany via the Northway Express line. In summers, free trolley service is provided. Low-cost curbside bus service is also provided by Megabus, with direct service to New York City and Burlington, Vermont.

Long-distance motorists generally reach Saratoga via Interstate 87, which north of Albany is known as the Adirondack Northway.  Three exits access the city.  Exit 13-S is optimal for reaching Saratoga Lake, and 13-N for the Saratoga Performing Arts Center (SPAC) and the southern and western quadrants of the city.  Visitors to the Saratoga Race Course use Exit 14, which is also arguably best for reaching downtown from the south.  Exit 15 serves Skidmore College, downtown if coming from the north, and the shopping malls just north of the city limits.

In popular culture
Saratoga Springs, Saratoga Race Course, and Saratoga society are frequently featured on-screen and mentioned in films and television.

Films featuring Saratoga Springs
 12 Years a Slave (2013) – Chiwetel Ejiofor, Lupita Nyong'o, Michael Fassbender, Benedict Cumberbatch
 A Dog Year (2009) – Jeff Bridges, Lauren Ambrose
 Aftermath (2008) – Chris Penn's last film
 Ass Backwards (2013) – Casey Wilson, June Diane Raphael, Alicia Silverstone, Jon Cryer
 Billy Bathgate (1991) – Dustin Hoffman, Nicole Kidman; the Kidman dancing scene was shot at the Hall of Springs
 Feast of Friends (1970) – The Doors' self-produced documentary; features lengthy concert footage at SPAC (on 9/1/68) and Jim Morrison reciting poetry backstage
 Ghost Story (1981) – Fred Astaire, John Houseman; houses on North Broadway were used as homes in this film. Cast included Fred Astaire, John Houseman, and Douglas Fairbanks, Jr.
 The Homestretch (1947) – Maureen O'Hara, Cornel Wilde
 Lolita (1962) – James Mason, Shelley Winters
 My Old Man (1979) – Kristy McNichol, Warren Oates, Eileen Brennan; made-for-TV movie, based on an Ernest Hemingway story, was filmed at Saratoga Race Course, various locations in Saratoga Springs, and throughout Saratoga County.
 Nobody's Fool (1994) – Paul Newman, Bruce Willis
 Paul's Case (1980) – Eric Roberts, Lindsay Crouse
 Saratoga (1937) – Clark Gable, Lionel Barrymore, Jean Harlow; notable for being Harlow's last film, as she collapsed on set during filming and died. Racing scenes were filmed at the Saratoga Race Course.
 Saratoga Trunk (1945) – Gary Cooper, Ingrid Bergman; while it was set in Saratoga, it was not filmed there.
 Seabiscuit (2003) – Tobey Maguire, Jeff Bridges; racing scenes shot at the Saratoga Race Course in November 2002.
 The Horse Whisperer (1998) – Robert Redford, Scarlett Johansson; special effects for the horse and rider accident were shot at the southern end of Saratoga Spa State Park. Also, a room at the Gideon Putnam Hotel was made into a shoddier motel room.
 The Skeptic (2009) – Tom Arnold, Zoe Saldana
 The Time Machine (2002) – Guy Pearce, Samantha Mumba
 The Way We Were (1973) – Robert Redford, Barbra Streisand; scenes also shot in nearby Ballston Spa
 Virgin Alexander (2012) – Rick Faugno, Paige Howard, Bronson Pinchot

Radio
 Saratoga Springs was the setting for a radio soap opera by the same name, created by ZBS Foundation and written by Meatball Fulton. The 1989 series was produced as 90 four-minute daily episodes for National Public Radio. The story incorporates Saratoga Springs historical facts and utilizes local actors as well as ZBS regulars. Lena Spencer of Caffe Lena is listed as playing herself. A "Best of Saratoga Springs" compilation (c. 2004) can be purchased from ZBS (www.zbs.org). During spring and early summer, 2007, the original four-minute episodes were podcast by ZBS.

Television
 In the Western series Maverick, Saratoga Springs serves as the primary setting of the season 3 episode "Maverick Springs" in which Bret Maverick, played by James Garner, is hired to convince a wealthy rancher's brother to return home.
 In the pilot episode of the 1960s sitcom Green Acres, it was noted that Eddie Albert's character of Oliver Wendell Douglas was born in Saratoga Springs.
 In the sci-fi series, The Orville, Saratoga Springs is featured in the 11th episode of season 2, "Lasting Impressions", which first aired on March 21, 2019. A time capsule from 2015 is unearthed out of Saratoga Springs approximately 400 years in the future by the ship's crew. One of the items contributed is a smartphone by a young woman who is a native of the city named Laura Huggins, played by Leighton Meester, who wanted future discoverers to know about her and her life. She becomes the object of infatuation by the ship's helmsman, Gordon Malloy, played by Scott Grimes. Gordon uploads the phone's data to the ship's computer and requests a simulation of Laura's environment and life in Saratoga Springs.

Music
 In the song "Adelaide's Lament" in the 1950 Broadway musical Guys and Dolls, Adelaide, who has an eternal cold caused by her fiancé's refusal to finally marry, sings "When they get on that train to Niagara / She can hear church bells chime / The compartment is air-conditioned / And the mood sublime... / Then they get off at Saratoga for the fourteenth time / A person can develop la grippe!"
 In the 1972 Carly Simon song "You're So Vain" the singer references horseracing in Saratoga Springs: "Well, I hear you went up to Saratoga, and your horse naturally won...."
 In 1987, Whitney Houston's music video for "Didn't We Almost Have It All", the second single from her second studio album, was filmed at Saratoga Performing Arts Center. The video was rotated regularly on MTV and it eventually became her fifth (of a record-breaking seven) consecutive number one hits on the Billboard 100 chart.
 On September 1st, 1977 Jackson Browne recorded "Rosie" at SPAC and it appeared on the platinum album Running on Empty the following year.

Food
 It is believed that the club sandwich was invented in the Canfield Casino in 1894.
 Potato chips were invented at Moon's Lake House on Saratoga Lake by George Crum in 1854, in response to a customer's complaint that his potatoes were cut too thick.

Other
 Walt Disney World Resort has a themed resort called Disney's Saratoga Springs Resort & Spa, whose theme and design was inspired by this city. Additionally, the Walt Disney World Railroad station at Main Street U.S.A. in the Magic Kingdom was modeled after and closely resembles the former Victorian era railroad depot that once stood in downtown Saratoga Springs.
 The James Bond novel Diamonds are Forever contained several scenes set in Saratoga Springs and its racecourse
 Saratoga native Solomon Northup's memoir Twelve Years a Slave was made into a hit movie in 2013.

Sister cities
  Vichy (France) since 1994
  Waveland, Mississippi In the spring of 2006, Saratoga Springs decided to help out the people of Waveland in the aftermath of Hurricane Katrina via a "Mardi Gras"-themed festival downtown.

See also
 Horses Saratoga Style
 List of Mayors of Saratoga Springs, New York
 Geyser Crest
 International Kindergarten Union, founded in Saratoga Springs, 1892
 Sans Souci Hotel (Ballston Spa)
 :Category:People from Saratoga Springs, New York

References

Further reading
 
 
 
 
 
 
 Paraschos, Janet Nyberg.  "Saratoga Springs" American Preservation (1978) 2#1 pp 59–72.
 
Sloane, Barbara Barton (2019). "Saratoga Springs: A Hudson Valley Treasure " The Pelham Post, Vol. 16.

External links

 
 Saratoga County History
 Our Town: Saratoga Springs  Documentary produced by WMHT (TV)

 
Cities in New York (state)
Spa towns in New York (state)
New York State Heritage Areas
Populated places established in 1776
Eastern Nazarene College locations
Cities in Saratoga County, New York